Capellen railway station is a railway station serving Capellen, in the commune of Mamer, in south-western Luxembourg.  It is operated by Chemins de Fer Luxembourgeois, the state-owned railway company.

The station is situated on Line 50, which connects Luxembourg City to the west of the country and the Belgian town of Arlon. It lies to the south of Capellen, close to the NAMSA site, on the road from Capellen to Holzem.

Gallery

External links
 Official CFL page on Capellen station
 Rail.lu page on Capellen station

Railway stations in Mamer
Railway stations on CFL Line 50